Guerrant House may refer to:

 Guerrant House (Arvonia, Virginia), NRHP-listed
 Guerrant House (Pilot, Virginia), listed on the NRHP in Montgomery County, Virginia